is a Japanese banker and a former Ministry of Finance government official. He serves as the 31st and current Governor of the Bank of Japan (BOJ). He was formerly the President of the Asian Development Bank from 1 February 2005 to 18 March 2013.

Early life 
Kuroda was born in 1944, in Ōmuta, Fukuoka Prefecture, the eldest son of his family. His father was a Japan Coast Guard officer. As a child he lived in Yokohama and Kobe before settling in Setagaya, Tokyo.

He attended University of Tokyo from 1963 to 1967, where he studied law and passed the bar examination before graduation. He joined the Ministry of Finance following graduation, and studied economics at Rice University on a Japanese government scholarship from 1969 to 1971. He went on to hold various posts at the Ministry of Finance, culminating in the post of Vice Minister of Finance for International Affairs (1999-2003). He resigned from the ministry in January 2003 and was appointed Special Advisor to the Cabinet in March 2003. From 2005 to 2013, he served as president of the Asian Development Bank.

Bank of Japan governorship 
Kuroda has advocated for loose monetary policy in Japan. His February 2013 nomination by the incoming government of the Prime Minister Shinzō Abe had been expected. Also nominated at the same time were Kikuo Iwata – "a harsh critic of past BOJ policies" – and Hiroshi Nakaso, a senior BOJ official in charge of international affairs, as Kuroda's two deputies. The former governor, Masaaki Shirakawa, left in March 2013.

2013

"There is plenty of room for monetary easing" in Japan, Kuroda said in a February 2013 interview, adding that the BOJ could go beyond purchasing government bonds to include corporate bonds "or even stocks". The yen, which "has fallen 10% against the dollar since Abe began his campaign in November", also fell on the news of Kuroda's nomination. However, the new governor was "expected to use his experience as Japan’s top currency official until 2003 to rebut overseas criticism that Tokyo is using easy monetary policy to drive the yen lower, triggering a war of competitive currency devaluation". Bloomberg quoted Stephen Roach, a senior fellow at Yale University, as saying about Kuroda's goals: "It’s a strong pledge from a well-intended man, but I’m not convinced it’s going to work." When Kuroda was asked the same question in his assumption of office's press conference on 21 March, Kuroda said the BOJ's role is to stabilize prices, and stabilizing exchange rates is the role of the Ministry of Finance. He also said that BOJ's "Quantitative and Qualitative Monetary Easing" policy was not intend to devalue the yen, aiming to grow out of deflation by targeting inflation. Although there was opposition from developing countries, the policy was accepted by the other developed countries in the G20 summit. However, G20 members emphasized to Japanese policymakers that Japanese policy should be directed at domestic goals while highlighting the importance of a Japanese effort to reduce government debt.

2016

In early 2016 after a stretch of global market weakness, Kuroda led Japan's move into negative interest rates. The BOJ had already pushed its balance sheet from 35% to 70+% of GDP since 2013 and was continuing to buy ¥80 trillion (over $600 billion) of securities each month. "Risks were growing that the slowdown in the Chinese, emerging and resource-producing countries, which has caused volatility and instability in financial markets since the beginning of the year, may hurt confidence among domestic [Japanese] companies", Kuroda was quoted as saying at the time of the interest-rate cut.

2022

Kuroda maintained a dovish stance in early 2022, with the Bank of Japan buying unlimited bonds at 0.25bps.

2023
Kuroda will be retired in April.

See also 
 Abenomics
 Reflation

References

|-

1944 births
Living people
Alumni of All Souls College, Oxford
Governors of the Bank of Japan
Academic staff of Hitotsubashi University
People from Ōmuta, Fukuoka
University of Tokyo alumni